Rosario, officially the Municipality of Rosario, is a 1st class municipality in the province of La Union, Philippines. According to the 2020 census, it has a population of 60,278 people.

The Kennon Road starts from this town and ends in Baguio. It is accessible via the MacArthur Highway, or via the NLEX (North Luzon Expressway) and TPLEX (Tarlac–Pangasinan–La Union Expressway), which will have its terminus in this town.

Etymology

There are several legends that explain how Rosario first got its name.  The best known says that the name "Rosario" came from the phrase “rosas del rio,” a reference to the beautiful landscape of the area when it was first discovered by Spaniards, with narrow valleys, wild animals, birds, rivers, brooks, dense forest, and the riverscape.

Another version or story suggests that name was a reference to the long range of foothills visible to the west of the Poblacion, which appear like big Rosary beads, forming a long, rocky, giant rosary.

Yet another legend first documented in 1887 associates the name of the town with a legendary creature called a Marukos (spelled "manrukos" in the 1887 text). In the legend, a group of youths were playing around and being noisy while loitering around near the floodplains of the Bued River between Rosario and Sison on a Sunday.  They were then confronted by an old man in white garb, whose flesh looked like a corpse - the Marukos.  The creature accused them of engaging in leisure activities on a holy day and put a curse on them, causing them to lose their sense of direction. As a result, they failed to notice that they were about to be swept away by one of the flash floods that often plagued the river.  In the end, only a young girl survived the encounter with the Marukos, by clinging to a "Balingkawanay" (Pittosporum pentandrum) tree.  According to the account, some stories claim that the girl had survived by praying the Rosary, while other stories say that her name was Rosario. Either way, the story of the Marukos became closely associated with the etymology of the town of Rosario, which used to be part of Pangasinan.

History
Rosario was formerly a part of Santo Tomas and became a municipality in 1869 by a decree.
Natives of Rosario emanated from Santo Tomas and Magsingal (Ilocos Sur), and also from Agoo, Tubao, Aringay, San Fernando and Bacnotan.

It was Don Mariano Posadas, Don Mariano Narcelles and Don Gavino Ordoña, who filed a petition with the authorities for the conversion of Rosario to a town from sitio or barangay. In 1869, the Spanish Provincial Governor created Rosario town and appointed Don Agustin Isidro de Guzman as its first Capitan Municipal.

Geography 
Rosario is the southernmost town of La Union, so it is referred to as the “Gateway to Ilocandia”. Rosario's national highway passes along a mountain at barangay Agat (of Sison, Pangasinan), then into the Bued bridge (the boundary marker between La Union and Pangasinan).

Climate

Barangays
Rosario is politically subdivided into barangays. These barangays are headed by elected officials: Barangay Captain, Barangay Council, whose members are called Barangay Councilors. All are elected every three years.

Demographics

Economy

Government
Just as the national government, the municipal government of Rosario, is divided into three branches: executive, legislative, and judiciary. The judicial branch is administered solely by the Supreme Court of the Philippines. The LGUs have control of the executive and legislative branches.

The executive branch is composed of the mayor and the barangay captain for the barangays.

The legislative branch is composed of the Sangguniang Bayan (town assembly), Sangguniang Barangay (barangay council), and the Sangguniang Kabataan for the youth sector.

The seat of Government is vested upon the Mayor and other elected officers who hold office at the RosarioTown hall. The Sangguniang Bayan is the center of legislation, stationed in Rosario Legislative Building or Town hall.

Elected officials

Tourism
Rosario has the following landmark attractions:

 Beach resorts
 Zoo
 The Queen of Peace Priory
 The Tree House
 World War II Vintage Canons located at the Town Plaza
 The Rosario Nature Park is hectares of lush green (La Union’s biggest camping site.  It is the venue of the Boys and Girls Scouts of the Philippines' Jamborees. It is also the meeting place of Air Soft Enthusiasts' War Games.
 Agoo–Damortis Protected Landscape and Seascape
 Public Market (near the Rosario-Pugo Junction Road and a new Slaughter House which, unlike its predecessor, was built away from residential areas.
 Yearly, on December 8, the Feast of Immaculate Concepcion, the town celebrates its fiesta. But it centers on the Linubian Festival (local cassava and banana cake) held from April 17 to 19. Rosario holds an Agri Trade Fair, showcasing its harvests topped by street-dancing competitions.

1869 Immaculate Concepcion Parish Church
The Immaculate Concepcion Parish Church was canonically erected in 1869. It is under the jurisdiction of the Roman Catholic Diocese of San Fernando de La Union (Dioecesis Ferdinandopolitana ab Unione, Suffragan of Lingayen – Dagupan, which was created on January 19, 1970, and erected on April 11, 1970, comprising the Civil Province of La Union, under the Titular, St. William the Hermit, February 10). The Church is under a diocese of the Latin Church of the Roman Catholic Church in the Philippines from the Archdiocese of Nueva Segovia.

The Rosario Church is under the Vicariate of St. Francis Xavier with Vicar Forane, Fr. Joel Angelo Licos.
Its Parish Priestis Fr. Raul S. Panay.

The church is located on the eastern side fronting the National Highway and the Municipal Building. It has an access road to the Rosario-Pugo-Baguio Road.

References

External links

 Rosario, La Union Website
 [ Philippine Standard Geographic Code]
 Philippine Census Information
 Local Governance Performance Management System

Municipalities of La Union